The Nueva Esparta-class destroyers were a class of destroyers used by the navy of Venezuela. The lead ship was named after Nueva Esparta (Spanish for "New Sparta"), one of the states of Venezuela.

These ships were ordered in 1950, and were built by the Vickers-Armstrongs shipyards in Barrow-in-Furness between 1951 and 1954.

History
The ships were designed by Vickers-Armstrong shipyards in the 1950s for the Venezuela naval forces. The design has been identified as a derivative of the Batch 3 Battle-class destroyers built for the United Kingdom and Australia, according to information released by the International Naval Research Organization and several independent researchers in 2006. 

The fleet arrangement for 30/04/1949 covers:

1 (25,000-ton) aircraft carrier (conceptual engineering)
1 (8,000-ton) cruiser (detailed engineering)
3 Nueva Esparta-class destroyers (built)
6 Alimirante Celemente-class destroyer escorts (built)
4 submarines (1 used from US Navy)
12 patrol boats (detailed engineering)
2 minesweepers (basic engineering)
1 marine assault ship (built)

The names assigned to these ships were associated with states in Venezuela.
Nueva Esparta refers to bravery and loyalty.
Zulia to remember the Battle of Lake Maracaibo in the Venezuelan War of Independence and the huge contribution of this state to that conflict.
Aragua because this state is the military heart of Venezuela, and as homage to the La Victoria battle remembered on "Youth Day".

Ships

Sensors and EW

Armament

Magazines

Communications and datalinks

Sensor signatures

Service
One ship was assigned to each destroyer division along with two Almirante Clemente-class destroyers;  Nueva Esparta went to the first division, Zulia to the second and Aragua to the third.

References

Bibliography

External links
http://www.globalsecurity.org/military/world/venezuela/navy-history.htm A brief history about this ships 
pictures
https://web.archive.org/web/20181005072516/http://www.ussmullinnix.org/1962Cruise.html
https://web.archive.org/web/20080217155523/http://www.navyphotos.co.uk/index12.htm
list of Venezuelan Navy ships

 

 
Destroyer classes